The Chile Classic was a golf tournament on the Korn Ferry Tour. It was played annually in Santiago, Chile. From 2012 to 2014, it was played at the Prince of Wales Country Club. In 2015, it moved to the Club de Golf Mapocho. It was one of several tournaments on the Nationwide Tour held outside the United States. The 2015 purse was $600,000, with $108,000 going to the winner.

Winners

Bolded golfers graduated to the PGA Tour via the Web.com Tour regular-season money list.

References

External links

Coverage on Web.com Tour's official site

Korn Ferry Tour events
Golf tournaments in Chile
2012 establishments in Chile